The 2004/2005 edition of Copa del Rey de Balonmano was held in Pontevedra, Galicia. The champion was BM Valladolid.

Quarter finals
25 May 2005:

CD Bidasoa 28-32  BM Valladolid:
Caja España Ademar León 31-27  Portland San Antonio:

26 May 2005:

BM Ciudad Real 39-24  BM Granollers:
SD Teucro 25-37  FC Barcelona Handbol:

SemiFinals
28 May 2005:

BM Ciudad Real 31-34  BM Valladolid:
FC Barcelona Handbol 33-28  Caja España Ademar León:

Final
29 May 2005:

BM Valladolid 27-25  FC Barcelona Handbol

See also
 Liga ASOBAL
 Handball in Spain

2004-05
2004–05 in Spanish handball